David Roux is an American businessman, technology investor and philanthropist. He co-founded Silver Lake Partners in 1999 with Jim Davidson, Glenn Hutchins and Roger McNamee.  In 2020, David founded BayPine LP with Anjan Mukherjee.

Early life and education 
David Roux was born in New London, Connecticut, and grew up in Lewiston, Maine, where he attended grade school and high school. David graduated from Harvard College (1978/79), has an M.Phil from King's College, Cambridge (1980), and an MBA from Harvard Business School (1984).  David Roux served in leadership roles at Lotus Software and Oracle Corporation before founding Silver Lake Partners in 1999.

Affiliations 
David has served in the boards of numerous private and public companies, including Boston Scientific, Symantec, Veritas Technologies, Seagate Technology, Business Objects, UGS Corp, Gartner Group, Intelsat, and Avaya, among others.  He is currently chairman of The Jackson Laboratory. David previously served on the boards of Bowdoin College, National Audubon Society, the Environmental Defense Fund (EDF) and Center for Advanced Study in the Behavioral Sciences at Stanford University.

Philanthropy 
David is chairman of the Roux Family Foundation, through which he and his wife, Barbara, support a variety of education, conservation, biomedical research, global public health and veterans organizations.  In 2013, he established the Roux Prize to honor individuals who have used health evidence in impactful ways.  In 2014, David established The Roux Family Center for Genomics and Computational Biology at Jackson Laboratory. Most recently, he underwrote the construction of the Roux Center for the Environment which opened in 2018 at Bowdoin College.

Most recently, David and Barbara Roux have collaborated with Northeastern University to create The Roux Institute in Portland, Maine. This project was announced in January 2020 to promote regional economic development in Northern New England and will be supported by a $100 million grant from the Roux family.

References 

Living people
American business executives
Alumni of the University of Cambridge
Harvard Business School alumni
Harvard College alumni
Year of birth missing (living people)